Sudam Marndi (born 2 June 1967) is a Minister of Revenue and Disaster Management  (Government of Odisha). He is a fifth term member of odisha legislative assembly. He was a member of the 14th Lok Sabha of India. He represented the Mayurbhanj constituency of Orissa and is a member of the Biju Janata Dal (BJD) political party.

References

External links
 Members of Fourteenth Lok Sabha - Parliament of India website

People from Odisha
People from Mayurbhanj district
Jharkhand Mukti Morcha politicians
India MPs 2004–2009
1967 births
Living people
Lok Sabha members from Odisha
Odisha politicians
Biju Janata Dal politicians